Rewi's Last Stand is the title of two feature films directed by pioneering New Zealand filmmaker Rudall Hayward: a 1925 silent movie, and 1940 remake with sound. They are historical dramas, based on the last stand of Rewi Maniapoto at the Battle of Ōrākau.

Hayward believed that New Zealand's history offered material as dramatic as any Hollywood western. He set out to make films involving conflicts between Māori and Pākehā "while there were still people alive" who remembered the period accurately.

1940 Remake

In 1940 Rudall Hayward remade his second feature on a more ambitious scale, this time with sound. He cast his future wife Ramai Hayward in the romantic lead.

The 1940 remake was released in a shortened version in the United Kingdom, as The Last Stand. The shortened version is the only one surviving.

References

External links
Rewi's Last Stand (1925) at IMDb
Rewi's Last Stand (1940) at IMDb
Article on the real last stand at NZ History
Rewi's Last Stand (1940) at New Zealand Feature Film Database

1925 films
1920s New Zealand films
1940 films
1940s New Zealand films
New Zealand silent films
1925 in New Zealand
1940 in New Zealand
Films set in New Zealand
New Zealand historical films
New Zealand Wars films
Sound film remakes of silent films
Films about Māori people
1940s English-language films
1920s English-language films